Christin Marie Baker is an American producer, director, and screenwriter from Nashville, Tennessee. She is the founder and CEO of Tello Films, a streaming network, production, and distribution company of films and web series with a lesbian focus.

Early life and education 
Baker is originally from Indiana but grew up in Nashville, Tennessee. She attended Middle Tennessee State University, where she graduated with a Bachelor of Arts in Television Production. In addition, Baker earned a Master's of Organizational Development and Management for Non-Profit Organizations from Springfield College.

Career 
Baker was interested in broadcast journalism and held an internship at a local station, but after a spell on a movie set as an extra shifted toward film-based storytelling. She worked for Regency Productions in Los Angeles, before moving to a television credits position with the Writers Guild of America. She worked for the YMCA of the USA, overseeing the arts and humanities programs.

In 2007, Baker co-founded Tello Films as an open platform that supported filmmakers who made content for the lesbian community. The site moved to a premium subscription service in 2009 and Baker started producing and directing content for it.

Personal life 
Baker married Deborah ("Deb") Mell, an American politician from Chicago, in 2011. They divorced in 2014.

Filmography

Film

Television

See also
 List of female film and television directors
 List of lesbian filmmakers
 List of LGBT-related films directed by women

References

External links 
 

Living people
American television producers
American television writers
American lesbian artists
American lesbian writers
American LGBT screenwriters
LGBT film producers
LGBT television producers
Lesbian screenwriters
American women television producers
American women television writers
Screenwriters from Tennessee
Year of birth missing (living people)
21st-century American LGBT people
21st-century American women writers